Mustafa Muğlalı (1882, in Muğla – 11 December 1951, in Istanbul) was an officer of the Ottoman Army and the general of the Turkish Army. He served as an officer in World War I and the Turkish War of Independence. As a General of the Third Army, he took part in the defense of Diyarbakır during the Sheikh Said Rebellion in 1925.

33 Bullets Incident
In 1943 he ordered the execution of 33 alleged Kurdish smugglers, an event known as the 33 Bullets Incident. One of the villagers survived. In 1949 Muğlalı was charged for the murders and sentenced to death. But later a court decided to lower the verdict to 20 years of imprisonment. He died in a military hospital in Ankara awaiting for a final sentence of the Supreme Court.

See also
List of high-ranking commanders of the Turkish War of Independence

Sources

External links
Van military barracks no longer named after controversial general, 2011-11-04, todayszaman.com.

1882 births
1951 deaths
People from Muğla
Ottoman Military Academy alumni
Ottoman Military College alumni
Ottoman Army officers
Ottoman military personnel of the Balkan Wars
Ottoman military personnel of World War I
Turkish military personnel of the Turkish War of Independence
Turkish military personnel of the Greco-Turkish War (1919–1922)
Recipients of the Medal of Independence with Red Ribbon (Turkey)
Turkish Army generals
Burials at Turkish State Cemetery